Dedo may refer to:

People
 Dedo Mraz
 Dedo Difie Agyarko-Kusi
 Dedo I, Count of Wettin

Places
 Dedo (woreda), Ethiopia
 Mount Dedo

Other
 Dedo (grape)